Metropolis is a 40-storey residential / hotel skyscraper in the Auckland CBD of Auckland, New Zealand, developed in 1999 by Krukziener Properties. Commended for its style and quality, the NZ$180 million cost of its construction also led to major financial fallout. Metropolis is considered one of Auckland's most exclusive apartment buildings, and it was the tallest residential building in New Zealand until 2020 when the nearby Pacifica  was completed.

The building was constructed from mainly reinforced concrete from 1997 to 1999, when it became the tallest building in New Zealand for one year until it was surpassed by the Vero Centre.  The building contains 368 apartments in addition to 55 hotel rooms and has 7 elevators made by Schindler Group and was designed by Peddle Thorp Architects.  

On 11 December 2013, Alain Robert climbed the building as part of a promotion for the Samsung Galaxy Gear smartwatch.

See also
List of tallest structures in New Zealand
List of tallest buildings in Auckland

References 

Skyscrapers in Auckland
Hotels in Auckland
Skyscraper hotels in New Zealand
1990s architecture in New Zealand
Residential skyscrapers
Buildings and structures completed in 1999
1999 establishments in New Zealand
Auckland CBD